The Forgotten Woman is a 2008 Canadian documentary film directed by Dilip Mehta and written by Deepa Mehta. The film is about widows in India and was inspired by Deepa Mehta's 2005 Academy Award-nominated film on the same subject, Water.

Cast 

 V. Mohini Giri as Self
 Aishwarya Mukherjee as Self
 Ginny Shrivastava as Self
 Indira Jaisingh as Self
 Usha Rai as Self

Synopsis 
The film The Forgotten Woman was shot in direct response to this interest and aims to increase awareness of the plight and marginalization of many of the millions of widows living in India today who are compelled by long-standing customs to spend their final years alone and shunned by the larger community. The movie examines how these widows, who were forced by their family to give up their belongings, ended up being social outcasts.

The Forgotten Woman seeks to raise awareness of the various and pervasive challenges that still surround women's pursuit of economic independence in the 21st century in order to achieve a semblance of self-respect, self-sufficiency, and fundamental human decency.

Production 
The film was primarily shot in Varanasi, Uttar Pradesh.

Awards 

 WINNER – Hollywood Film Festival – BEST DOCUMENTARY
 WINNER – Mira Das Doc, Spain – BEST HUMAN RIGHTS DOCUMENTARY
 Selected as part of the Elite Series of the Academy of Motions Pictures (The Oscars)

References

External links 

2008 films
Canadian documentary films
Films about widowhood in India
Films shot in Uttar Pradesh
Documentary films about women in India
2000s Canadian films